Crookes is a surname. Notable people with the surname include:

Derek Crookes (born 1969), South African cricketer
Jason Crookes (born 1990), English rugby league player
Joy Crookes (born 1998), British singer-songwriter
Norman Crookes (born 1935), South African cricketer, father of Derek
Ralph Crookes (1846–1897), English cricketer 
William Crookes (1832–1919), English chemist and physicist